Mahmoud Ahmed Ibrahim Hassan (born 1 October 1994), commonly known as Trézéguet, is an Egyptian professional footballer who plays as a winger for Süper Lig club Trabzonspor and the Egypt national team. His nickname is taken from the French former footballer David Trezeguet, after his former youth coach noticed similarities between the pair in playing style and appearance.

He began his career with Al Ahly, breaking into the first team at the age of 18 and helping them win the 2012 CAF Champions League and 2013 CAF Champions League. In 2015, he joined Belgian team Anderlecht and the move was later made permanent. However, he struggled to establish himself in the first team and spent the following two seasons on loan, first with fellow Belgian side Mouscron and later Turkish side Kasımpaşa. With Kasımpaşa, he became the highest scoring Egyptian player in the Turkish top flight in a single season which prompted the club to make the transfer permanent in 2018.

Having represented Egypt at under-20 and under-23 level, Trézéguet made his full debut for the Egyptian senior side in 2014 at the age of 19 in a friendly against Kenya. He was named in Egypt's squad for the 2018 FIFA World Cup, playing in all three group matches. To date, he has made over 50 appearances for his country's national team, scoring 8 goals.

Club career

Al Ahly
Born in Kafr El Sheikh governorate, he was given the nickname Trézéguet at age nine by Badr Ragab, a youth coach at his school team, due to his goalscoring record for the team and his shaven head appearance resembling the French international footballer David Trezeguet. Playing as a striker, he joined the youth academy at Al Ahly after turning down an offer to move to Qatar. He soon converted to playing as a midfielder in the youth academy following the advice of coach Ali Maher. After being promoted to the senior squad by manager Manuel José de Jesus, on the advice of Maher, he made his professional debut in the 2012 CAF Champions League as a substitute in place of Mohamed Aboutrika in a match against local rivals Zamalek. Jesus later described him as "one of the best youngsters he's ever came across." He made his first start for Al Ahly later in the competition against Ghanaian side Berekum Chelsea. Al Ahly went on to win the Champions League although Trézéguet did not feature in the final.

In April 2013, he was offered a trial for French side Nice after establishing himself in the first team at eighteen and playing in the U20 African Youth Cup, postponing the trial for a later date to help Al Ahly during an injury crisis that left them short of first team players.

He was later offered a trial with English side Nottingham Forest but the club pulled out of a potential loan transfer with an option to buy after being unable to meet Al Ahly's valuation, stated at £1 million by Al Ahly's director of football Sayed Abdel-Hafiz. In December 2013, he was linked with Scottish club Celtic, who saw a bid of £420,000 rejected. However, he later ended speculation over his future by stating his intention to remain with Al Ahly until at least the end of the 2013–14 season. In January 2015, he won the Best Egypt-based Player Award at the annual Youth and Sports Broadcasting annual gala.

After helping Al Ahly win the Egyptian Premier League title in the 2014–15 season, speculation over his future arose again after it was confirmed that they would "listen to offers" as the club began to experience financial difficulties The end of his season was disrupted after being ruled out for six weeks with a dislocated shoulder suffered during a 2–1 defeat to Tunisian side Club Africain.

Anderlecht

Despite Al Ahly director of football Wael Gomaa stating his desire for Trézéguet to remain with the club, describing him as "one of the main elements of the team", on 6 August 2015, Trézéguet joined Belgian side Anderlecht on loan for a fee of €1 million, with Anderlecht gaining an option to sign him on a permanent basis after the season-long loan for a further €2.5 million. His arrival at the club was disrupted by a broken shoulder sustained while training with his national team in the United Arab Emirates, ruling him out for several months after being forced to undergo surgery. Anderlecht manager Besnik Hasi stated his disappointment in the disruption of the loan spell and admitted that it had been difficult for the club to analyse Trézéguet's ability.

Trézéguet returned to training in early December 2015, before making his competitive debut for Anderlecht on 27 December 2015 in a 2–1 victory over Westerlo when he replaced Dodi Lukebakio in the 82nd minute. Following his debut, Hasi described him as having "great ability and the speed, and I can see a bright future for him." He made his first start for the club a month later in a 2–0 defeat to Gent. However, he was dropped from the side soon after with Hasi claiming that the language barrier was making it difficult for Trézéguet to understand the team's tactics, commenting "He is a diligent player and trains well with us so [...] but he rarely understands what we say," and that he was no longer considered the star player of the team as he had been with Al Ahly.

In March 2016, Anderlecht announced they were considering exercising their option to sign Trézéguet permanently from Al Ahly for a reported transfer fee of €2.2 million, despite only making seven league appearances in his first season. In May the move was completed, with Trézéguet becoming the second most expensive sale in Al Ahly's history after Flávio Amado.

Loan to Mouscron
He enjoyed a prolific pre-season prior to the 2016–17 season, scoring four times, earning praise from new manager René Weiler. However, the signing of Nicolae Stanciu prompted the club to offer Trézéguet out on loan to gain playing time, eventually joining fellow Belgian side Royal Excel Mouscron on a season-long loan deal. In his first seven appearances for the club, he was directly involved in five goals, scoring two and assisting three including a solo effort against Gent after starting a run from inside his own half, leading manager Glen De Boeck to label him the "most talented player in our team."

Mouscron became embroiled in a relegation battle but Trézéguet gained praise for his performances from Anderlecht coach Jean-Francois Lenvain, who continued working with him during his loan spell, and led former Anderlecht player Wim De Coninck to call for Trézéguet to be recalled by Anderlecht to replace Stanciu, remarking "If he (Trézéguet) had the amount of chances Stanciu has now he'd be in a different place." In the final match of the season, Trézéguet scored the opening goal of a 2–0 victory over KV Kortrijk that saw Mouscron overtake Westerlo to avoid relegation from the Belgian First Division A. After featuring in the Europa League playoffs, he returned to Anderlecht at the end of his loan spell having scored seven goals during 28 appearances in all competitions. Prior to his return, it was reported that Anderlecht intended to sell Trézéguet due to manager Wilder deeming him "not tactically disciplined", an opinion supported by Mouscron manager Mircea Rednic who commented "he runs in every part of the pitch except the part we need him to go to."

Kasımpaşa
After returning to Anderlecht, Trézéguet was linked with transfers to Turkish side Galatasaray and his former club Al Ahly and even considered terminating his contract with the club. He eventually joined Turkish side Kasımpaşa on a season-long loan deal with the club having the option to make the move permanent for €2 million. He made his debut for the club on the opening day of the 2017–18 season, scoring the opening goal of a 3–1 victory over Alanyaspor. He scored five goals in his first twelve appearances for Kasımpaşa, including a brace against Akhisar Belediyespor in the Turkish Cup, before his run in the first team was interrupted following a three match ban he received after being sent off in a match against Bursaspor.

On his return, Trézéguet surpassed his previous career high goalscoring record for a single season after scoring his ninth goal on 4 February 2018. His tenth goal of the season, scored in the club's following match against Yeni Malatyaspor, saw him become only the seventh Egyptian player to reach double figures in a European league and also saw him surpass Ahmed Hassan's record for the most goals scored by an Egyptian player in the Turkish top flight. His performances saw the club activate their clause to make his transfer permanent.

Despite signing permanently with the club in April, Trézéguet was subject to several transfer offers during the 2018 summer transfer window. He held talks with representatives of fellow Turkish side Galatasaray while attending a national team training camp in Italy, later describing the club as his preferred destination. A move to Italian side Inter Milan collapsed after the club stalled on completing the deal. The deal was to include spending the first year on loan with fellow Serie A side Parma due to Milan already reaching their foreign player quota for the upcoming season. A deal was later agreed with Czech side Slavia Prague, after the side met his €5 million release clause, but was placed on hold by Trézéguet despite personal terms being agreed and the player passing a medical. The transfer was eventually cancelled with Trézéguet declaring his desire to remain with Kasımpaşa. His performances during the 2017–18 season saw him nominated for the Süper Lig Player of the Year award, losing out to Bafétimbi Gomis.

Aston Villa
On 24 July 2019, Trézéguet joined Premier League club Aston Villa for a fee of £8.75 million, subject to work visa and international clearance. He made his debut on 10 August in a 3–1 loss away to Tottenham Hotspur, playing the first 59 minutes before being substituted for fellow new signing Jota. Three weeks later, he was sent off in the 54th minute as Villa lost 1–0 at Crystal Palace.

Trézéguet scored his first goal for Aston Villa on 2 November 2019, in a 2–1 defeat to Liverpool. His performance in that game earned plaudits from national football pundits, such as Ian Wright. On 28 January 2020, he scored an injury time winner in an EFL Cup semi-final against Leicester City, to send Villa to their first final in the tournament since 2010.

Trezeguet played a key role in Aston Villa's strong run of form in their final 4 games of the season, scoring 3 crucial goals against Crystal Palace and Arsenal to help them achieve Premier League survival.

On 30 November 2020, Trézéguet suffered a severe facial injury during a Premier League defeat to West Ham United. Shortly after recovering from that injury, but before featuring in another Villa game, Trézéguet suffered a hamstring injury which was expected to keep him sidelined for a month. On 13 January 2021, Trézéguet revealed on his Twitter account that he had recovered from the hamstring injury, but had now tested positive for COVID-19 and was forced to isolate at home. He was finally able to make his return to the first team as a late substitute in a 2–0 win over Newcastle United on 23 January 2021.

On 10 April 2021, Trézéguet suffered another injury setback, suffering a torn ACL after a challenge from Trent Alexander-Arnold in a 2–1 away defeat to Liverpool. The injury was expected to end the 2020–21 season for Trézéguet at a minimum. He returned to the first team on 2 January 2022, in a 2–1 away defeat to Brentford, in which he received criticism for appearing to simulate contact with Saman Ghoddos in order to try and win a penalty.

Loan to İstanbul Başakşehir 
On 8 February 2022, Trézéguet joined İstanbul Başakşehir on loan until the end of the season, in a bid to get more game time and improve his fitness. He made his debut for Başakşehir on 12 February 2022, in a 2–0 victory over Gaziantep, in which he provided an assist for Pizzi's opening goal.

Trabzonspor 
On 4 July 2022, Trézéguet returned to the Süper Lig once again, joining reigning champions Trabzonspor on a permanent deal, for a transfer fee rumoured to be around £4.25M.

International career

Trézéguet represented Egypt at U20 level, being named in the squad for the 2013 FIFA U-20 World Cup. In his side's final group game, he scored the opening goal during a 2–0 victory over England on 20 June 2013, dribbling past two players before scoring. However, despite their victory, Egypt were eliminated in the group stage after finishing third. Trézéguet made his debut with the senior national team on 30 August 2014 when he was 19 years and 10 months old in a 1–0 victory over Kenya, before scoring his first senior goal in his third appearance during a 2–0 victory over Equatorial Guinea.

He was chosen by Héctor Cúper for the squad to play the 2017 Africa Cup of Nations, where he was a regular in the team's starting line-up; he helped his nation to reach the final of the tournament, losing 2–1 against Cameroon. He later credited Cúper for his improved form in the Cup of Nations and qualifying matches for the 2018 FIFA World Cup, where he came on as a substitute during his country's decisive qualifying victory over DR Congo, stating "He is a coach who respects those who exert efforts in training and matches." In May 2018, he was named in Egypt's preliminary squad for the 2018 World Cup in Russia. After being included in the final 23-man squad, he started all three of Egypt's group matches, defeats to Uruguay, Russia and Saudi Arabia, as they were eliminated in the group stage.

Trézéguet returned from injury in time to be selected by Carlos Queiroz for the squad to play in the 2021 Africa Cup of Nations - which was taking place in January 2022, due to COVID-19. On 30 January 2022, he scored an extra-time winner in a 2–1 quarter-final victory over Morocco. Trézéguet featured in all of Egypt's matches in the tournament as they were defeated by Senegal on penalties in the final.

Career statistics

Club

International

Egypt score listed first, score column indicates score after each Trézéguet goal.

Honours

Club 
Al Ahly
 Egyptian Premier League: 2013–14
 Egyptian Super Cup: 2012, 2014
 CAF Champions League: 2012, 2013
 CAF Super Cup: 2013, 2014
 CAF Confederation Cup: 2014

Aston Villa
EFL Cup runner-up: 2019–20

Trabzonspor
 Turkish Super Cup: 2022

International 
Egypt U20
 Africa U-20 Cup of Nations: 2013

Egypt
 Africa Cup of Nations runner-up: 2017, 2021

Individual 
Awards
 Süper Lig Team of the Season: 2017–18, 2018–19

References

External links

1994 births
Living people
People from Kafr El Sheikh Governorate
Egyptian footballers
Egyptian Premier League players
Egypt youth international footballers
Association football midfielders
Al Ahly SC players
Belgian Pro League players
R.S.C. Anderlecht players
Aston Villa F.C. players
Royal Excel Mouscron players
Süper Lig players
Kasımpaşa S.K. footballers
Egypt international footballers
2013 African U-20 Championship players
2017 Africa Cup of Nations players
2018 FIFA World Cup players
2019 Africa Cup of Nations players
2021 Africa Cup of Nations players
Egyptian expatriate footballers
Expatriate footballers in Belgium
Egyptian expatriate sportspeople in Belgium
Expatriate footballers in Turkey
Egyptian expatriate sportspeople in Turkey
Premier League players
Expatriate footballers in England
Egyptian expatriate sportspeople in England
İstanbul Başakşehir F.K. players
Trabzonspor footballers